In geometry, an 8-cube is an eight-dimensional hypercube. It has 256 vertices, 1024 edges, 1792 square faces, 1792 cubic cells, 1120 tesseract 4-faces, 448 5-cube 5-faces, 112 6-cube 6-faces, and 16 7-cube 7-faces.

It is represented by Schläfli symbol {4,36}, being composed of 3 7-cubes around each 6-face. It is called an octeract, a portmanteau of tesseract (the 4-cube) and oct for eight (dimensions) in Greek. It can also be called a regular hexdeca-8-tope or hexadecazetton, being an 8-dimensional polytope constructed from 16 regular facets.

It is a part of an infinite family of polytopes, called hypercubes. The dual of an 8-cube can be called an 8-orthoplex and is a part of the infinite family of cross-polytopes.

Cartesian coordinates 
Cartesian coordinates for the vertices of an 8-cube centered at the origin and edge length 2 are
 (±1,±1,±1,±1,±1,±1,±1,±1)
while the interior of the same consists of all points (x0, x1, x2, x3, x4, x5, x6, x7) with -1 < xi < 1.

As a configuration
This configuration matrix represents the 8-cube. The rows and columns correspond to vertices, edges, faces, cells, 4-faces, 5-faces, 6-faces, and 7-faces. The diagonal numbers say how many of each element occur in the whole 8-cube. The nondiagonal numbers say how many of the column's element occur in or at the row's element.

The diagonal f-vector numbers are derived through the Wythoff construction, dividing the full group order of a subgroup order by removing one mirror at a time.

Projections

Derived polytopes 

Applying an alternation operation, deleting alternating vertices of the octeract, creates another uniform polytope, called a 8-demicube, (part of an infinite family called demihypercubes), which has 16 demihepteractic and 128 8-simplex facets.

Related polytopes
The 8-cube is 8th in an infinite series of hypercube:

References 

 H.S.M. Coxeter: 
 Coxeter, Regular Polytopes, (3rd edition, 1973), Dover edition, p. 296, Table I (iii): Regular Polytopes, three regular polytopes in n-dimensions (n≥5)
 Kaleidoscopes: Selected Writings of H.S.M. Coxeter, edited by F. Arthur Sherk, Peter McMullen, Anthony C. Thompson, Asia Ivic Weiss, Wiley-Interscience Publication, 1995,  
 (Paper 22) H.S.M. Coxeter, Regular and Semi Regular Polytopes I, [Math. Zeit. 46 (1940) 380-407, MR 2,10]
 (Paper 23) H.S.M. Coxeter, Regular and Semi-Regular Polytopes II, [Math. Zeit. 188 (1985) 559-591]
 (Paper 24) H.S.M. Coxeter, Regular and Semi-Regular Polytopes III, [Math. Zeit. 200 (1988) 3-45]
 Norman Johnson Uniform Polytopes, Manuscript (1991)
 N.W. Johnson: The Theory of Uniform Polytopes and Honeycombs, Ph.D. (1966)

External links 
 

 Multi-dimensional Glossary: hypercube Garrett Jones

8-polytopes